The Westcoast Pipeline, also known as the Westcoast Transmission System  or the BC Pipeline, is a natural gas pipeline in British Columbia that brings natural gas from the  Western Canadian Sedimentary Basin south to the province's heavily populated Lower Mainland (which includes Vancouver). It connects to the Northwest Pipeline in the United States and east to TransCanada pipeline. Built in 1957 by Frank McMahon's Westcoast Transmission Co. Ltd., the 650-mile gas pipeline from Taylor in north-eastern British Columbia to the United States was Canada's first "big-inch" pipeline.

From 2002 to 2007, it was owned by Duke Energy of Charlotte, North Carolina. In 2007, Duke's natural gas business was spun off as Spectra Energy, which merged with Enbridge in 2017.

The pipeline experienced an explosion in Shelley, British Columbia, near Prince George, on October 9, 2018. The explosion forced about 100 members of the Lheidli T'enneh Band to evacuate their homes. Although nobody was hurt in the  explosion, and no property was damaged apart from the pipeline itself, the explosion led to shortages of natural gas in British Columbia. In 2019, the affected First Nation filed a lawsuit seeking a permanent injunction which would prevent Enbridge from operating the pipeline in their territory and reserves, and require the company to dismantle the pipeline and restore the affected lands to their natural state.

Enbridge has proposed a "reliability and expansion program" which would entail replacing old compressor stations, adding an additional compressor station, and other maintenance activities.

See also
 Westcoast Transmission Co.
 List of North American natural gas pipelines

References

External links
 December 27, 1954 TIME magazine article titled The Big Poker Game on Frank McMahon's plans for the Westcoast Transmission pipeline
 October 21, 1957 TIME magazine article titled Tycoon's Wing-Ding, a detailed account on Frank McMahon and the completion of the Westcoast Transmission pipeline

Transport buildings and structures in British Columbia
Natural gas pipelines in Washington (state)
Natural gas pipelines in the United States
Natural gas pipelines in Canada
Duke Energy
Enbridge pipelines
Enbridge